The WAC men's soccer tournament is the conference championship tournament in soccer for the Western Athletic Conference.  The tournament has been held every year since 2013. Previously it was held every year between 1996 and 1999 before the sport was discontinued by the conference for 14 years. It is a single-elimination tournament and seeding is based on regular season records. The winner, declared conference champion, receives the conference's automatic bid to the NCAA Division I men's soccer championship.

Champions

Key

Finals

Performance by school

Italics indicate a school that is no longer a conference member

† No longer sponsor men's soccer

References

External links